Kouakou Odilon Dorgeless Kossounou (born 4 January 2001) is an Ivorian professional footballer who plays as a defender for Bundesliga club Bayer Leverkusen and the Ivory Coast national team.

Club career

Early career
Kossounou started his career in the academy of ASEC Mimosas in Abidjan. After having been discovered at the youth tournament Gothia Cup in 2016, he was first invited to train with Swedish Allsvenskan club Hammarby IF. He went on to visit the club on numerous occasions throughout the next few years.

Hammarby IF
On 11 January 2019, shortly after his 18th birthday, Kossounou signed a four-year contract with Hammarby. He made his competitive debut for the club on 18 February, in the main domestic cup Svenska Cupen, providing an assist to Mats Solhem in a 3-0 win against Varbergs BoIS. Kossounou went on to make nine league appearances in Allsvenskan for the club, most notably being voted man of the match in a 2–2 home draw against IFK Norrköping. On 8 May 2019, Hammarby reached an agreement with Belgian side Club Brugge for the transfer of Kossonou, effective on 1 July the same year. The club received a record breaking fee for the player, reportedly for a fee of around €4 million (or 44 million SEK) that could rise higher subject to bonuses, plus a 10 percent sell-on clause.

Club Brugge
On 1 July 2019, Kossounou completed his transfer to Club Brugge. In his first season at the club, Kossounou picked up a league winner's medal as Club Brugge were declared champions in April 2020 with the Pro League being cut short by the COVID-19 pandemic in Belgium.

Bayer Leverkusen
On 22 July 2021, Kossounou joined Bundesliga club Bayer Leverkusen on a five-year deal for a reported €23 million fee.

International career
Kossounou debuted with the Ivory Coast national team in a 1–1 friendly draw with Belgium on 8 October 2020.

Playing style 
Kossounou prevalently plays as centre back and excels in his tackling: his long limbs and the excellent timing of his interventions gives him one of the highest tackle success ratios in Europe.

Outside football
In 2020, Kossounou was the subject of a TV-documentary on Swedish television titled "Det vackra spelet" (The beautiful game), that for three years followed him on his transfer to Hammarby and then on to Club Brugge.

Career statistics

Club

International

Honours
Club Brugge
 Belgian First Division A: 2019–20, 2020–21
 Belgian Super Cup: 2021

References

External links

2001 births
Living people
Ivorian footballers
Ivory Coast international footballers
Hammarby Fotboll players
Club Brugge KV players
Bayer 04 Leverkusen players
Allsvenskan players
Belgian Pro League players
Bundesliga players
Ivorian expatriate footballers
Expatriate footballers in Sweden
Ivorian expatriate sportspeople in Sweden
Association football defenders
Expatriate footballers in Belgium
Ivorian expatriate sportspeople in Belgium
Expatriate footballers in Germany
2021 Africa Cup of Nations players